Philanthus solivagus is a species of wasp in the family Crabronidae. It is found in North America.

References

Crabronidae
Articles created by Qbugbot
Insects described in 1837
Hymenoptera of North America
Taxa named by Thomas Say